Del otro lado del puente (Spanish: "On the Other Side of the Bridge") is a 1980 Mexican musical drama film directed by Gonzalo Martínez Ortega and starring Juan Gabriel, Valentin Trujillo, Lucha Villa, Julio Alemán, Estela Núñez, Narciso Busquets and Ana Laura Maldonado. The story concerns a Mexican who is attracted by stories of unlimited opportunities in the United States, but once he arrives to the country faces a harsh reality, but is nonetheless determined to succeed.

It was one in a wave of Mexican films about the Chicano experience. It was the first in a trilogy of films directed by Martínez Ortega and starring Juan Gabriel, followed by the autobiographical duology El Noa Noa (1981) and Es mi vida (1982).

Plot
The young Mexican Alberto (Juan Gabriel) lives in Los Angeles with the family of his older brother, Manny (Narciso Busquets) and studies at UCLA with the support of Professor Bob (Julio Alemán). Another young man, Jimmy Joe (Valentin Trujillo), who lives with his sister Estela (Ana Laura Maldonado), is encouraged to quit drug addiction at a youth rehabilitation center coordinated by Manny. Disillusioned with a gringa, Alberto meets Estela at a disco and becomes her boyfriend.

Cast
Juan Gabriel as Alberto Molina
Valentin Trujillo as Jimmy Joe
Lucha Villa as Mother
Julio Alemán as Professor Bob
Estela Núñez as Singer
Narciso Busquets as Manuel Martínez "Manny"
Ana Laura Maldonado as Estela (as Ana Laura)
Billy Cardenas as Daniel Martínez "Danny"
Barbara Kay as Doris
Isaac Ruiz
Beatriz Marín
Roberto Rodríguez
Mark Carlton
Joe Kaniewski
Rick Williamson as Joey (as Rick Miko)
David Povall as TV Announcer (as David Estuardo)
Joseanna Garza
José Luis Rodríguez
José Luis García Agraz
Emma Serra
Carlos Apodaca
Ronnie Cárdenas
Lucrecia Muñoz as Clinic Employee (uncredited)

Production
It was filmed in 1978.

Release
It was released on the Aragón 2, Colonial, Ermita, Marina, Soledad, Tlatelolco, Variedades, Vallejo 2000, Lago 2, and Premier cinemas on 17 April 1980, for six weeks.

Reception
In Historia de la producción cinematográfica mexicana, 1977–1978, Marina Díaz López referred to the film by saying of Juan Gabriel that the "singer owed little of his great fame to his few jobs as a movie star".

References

External links

1980 films
1980s Spanish-language films
1980s musical drama films
Films directed by Gonzalo Martínez Ortega
Mexican musical drama films
Films about Mexican Americans
Hispanic and Latino American drama films
1980s English-language films
1980s American films
1980s Mexican films